Maclagan or MacLagan may refer to:

People 
 Andrew Douglas Maclagan FRSE (1812-1900), Scottish physician
 Bill Maclagan (1858–1926), Scotland and British Lions rugby union captain
 Diane Maclagan (born 1974), mathematician
 Edward Douglas MacLagan (1864–1952), British administrator in India
 Sir Eric Maclagan (1879–1951), British museum director
 Gilchrist Maclagan (1879–1915), British rower, gold medallist in the 1908 Olympics
 Michael Maclagan (1914–2003), historian, antiquary and herald at Oxford
 Myrtle Maclagan (1911–1993), English cricketer
 Thomas John MacLagan (1838–1903), Scottish pharmacologist
 William Maclagan (1826–1910), Archbishop of York

Places 
 Maclagan, Queensland, a town in the Toowoomba Region, Australia
 North Maclagan, Queensland, a locality in the Toowoomba Region, Australia

See also
McLagan (disambiguation)